The 1945 NFL Championship Game was the 13th National Football League (NFL) championship game. Held on December 16, the Cleveland Rams defeated the Washington Redskins 15–14 at Cleveland Stadium in Cleveland, Ohio.

This was the last game before the Rams moved west to Los Angeles, California. One play which provided the Rams' margin of victory led to a significant rule change in professional football. If the title game had ended in a tie, the teams would have shared the championship.

which significantly curtailed the expected attendance and revenue.

The game
In the first quarter, the Redskins had the ball at their own 5-yard line. Dropping back into the end zone, quarterback Sammy Baugh threw the ball, but it hit the goal post (which were on the goal line from  through ) and bounced back to the ground in the end zone. Under the rules at the time, this was a safety, which gave the Rams a 2–0 lead.

In the second quarter, Baugh suffered bruised ribs and was replaced by Frank Filchock, who threw a 38-yard touchdown pass to Steve Bagarus to give the Redskins a 7–2 lead. The Rams scored just before halftime when rookie quarterback Bob Waterfield completed a 37-yard touchdown pass to Jim Benton. Waterfield's ensuing extra point was partially blocked, with the ball teetering on the crossbar, but it dropped over to give Cleveland a 9–7 lead.

In the third quarter, the Rams increased their lead to 15–7 when Jim Gillette scored on a 44-yard touchdown reception, but this time the extra point was missed.

The Redskins then came back to cut their deficit to 15–14 with Bob Seymour's 8-yard touchdown catch from Filchock; in the fourth quarter, Washington kicker Joe Aguirre missed two field goals attempts, of 46 and 31 yards, that could have won the game.

But it was the first quarter safety that proved to be the margin of victory. After the game, Redskins owner George Preston Marshall was so incensed at the outcome that he became a driving force in passing a major rule change after the season - a forward pass that strikes the goal posts is automatically ruled incomplete. This rule eventually became known as the "Baugh/Marshall Rule" and remained in effect until , when the goal posts returned to the end line and were impossible to hit with a legal forward pass, which made the rule dead letter.

Officials
Referee: Ronald Gibbs
Umpire: Harry Robb
Head Linesman: Charlie Berry
Field Judge: Bill Downes 

Player shares
Total revenue generated by the championship game totaled $164,542, which included $15,081 for radio broadcast rights, a new record. Of this total, $95,261 was allotted to the players, resulting in shares of about $1,409 per player for the victorious Rams and $902 per player for the losing Redskins.

Rams relocation to Los Angeles
Despite winning the World Championship, Rams owner Dan Reeves lost $64,000 with his franchise during the 1945 season.

These financial losses, combined with the Rams' poor home attendances and the awarding of a Cleveland franchise (Browns) in the soon to be formed All-America Football Conference (AAFC), ensured the relocation of the Rams to Los Angeles in January 1946.

Game statistics

Scoring summary

First downs: Rams 14, Redskins 8

Yards rushing: Rams 44 carries for 180 yards, Redskins 34 carries for 35 yards

Passing: Rams 11-for-27 for 192 yards (2 TDs), Redskins 9-for-20 for 179 yards (2 TDs)

Return yardage: Rams 131, Redskins 155

Fumbles-Lost: Rams 1-1, Redskins 1-0

Penalties: Rams 6 for 60 yards, Redskins 4 for 29 yards

References

Further reading
 Bruce Nash and Allen Zullo, The Football Hall of Shame. New York: Pocket Books, 1986; pp. 68–69.
 The Sporting News Complete Super Bowl Book 1995. St. Louis, MO: Sporting News Publishing Co., 1995; pp. 395–396.

Champ
1945 NFL Championship Game
Cleveland Rams postseason
Washington Redskins postseason
December 1945 sports events in the United States
1945 in sports in Ohio
1940s in Cleveland
Sports competitions in Cleveland